Andrea Norris (née Geubelle; born June 26, 1991) is an American track and field athlete who competes in the long jump and triple jump. Norris won the American title in 2013.

Norris is a University of Kansas alumna and is a three-time NCAA champion, having won the 2012 indoor triple jump title and a long jump/triple jump double at the 2013 NCAA Indoor Championship. In the triple jump, she also placed third at the 2012 United States Olympic Trials and was the gold medallist at the 2012 NACAC Under-23 Championships in Athletics.

Early life
Raised in University Place, Washington, she attended Curtis Senior High School and competed in track and field while there. She won the long jump at the 2008 AAU Junior Olympic Games then won both long and triple jump events at the 2009 National High School Championships. She was also the state champion in the 100-meter dash that year.

College career
Norris chose to study at the University of Kansas and began competing collegiately for the Kansas Jayhawks, being coached by Stanley Redwine. In her first major meet she came fifth in the long jump and third in the triple jump at the Big 12 Conference indoor championships. She failed to record a mark at the NCAA Indoor Championship. She was runner-up in both events at the Big 12 outdoor meet and also competed at the NCAA Outdoor Championship, where she was eighth in the long jump and eleventh in the triple jump. At the 2010 World Junior Championships in Athletics, her first international competition, she failed to make the long jump final but came ninth in the triple jump.

Norris fared less well in her second year, her only top three Big 12 conference came in the long jump indoors. She placed eighth in the triple jump at the NCAA indoor and outdoor meets. She made her breakthrough in the triple jump at the start of the following season. In the long jump, she also placed second at the Big 12 and eighth at the NCAA indoors.

At the beginning of the 2012 outdoor season she had a long jump best of  then took the Big 12 triple jump outdoor title, as well as second in the long jump. She had a big personal record improvement at the NCAA outdoors, where her mark of  took her to third place (she managed sixth in the long jump). In good form, she tried for the Olympic team at the 2012 United States Olympic Trials. She finished third in the triple jump, but did not have the qualifying standard to gain selection. She had her first international medal at the 2012 NACAC Under-23 Championships in Athletics, winning the triple jump gold medal.

She entered as one of the favourites at the NCAA Outdoor Championships but left as runner-up in both the long jump and triple jump. However, these performances helped the Kansas Jayhawks win their first ever NCAA women's title.

Professional
Her 2014 season will begin at 2014 USA Indoor Track and Field Championships between February 20 - 22nd in Albuquerque, New Mexico with the long jump and triple jump. Norris jumped  6.61m (21-08.25 feet) to place 3rd and 13.66m (44-09.75 feet) to place 2nd.

Norris, alongside Keturah Orji and Christina Epps, achieved the 2016 Olympic Standard at 2016 United States Olympic Trials and was selected for the United States Olympic team. Norris placed 21st at the 2016 Olympic triple jump, jumping .

Andrea Norris placed sixth in triple jump at 2020 USA Indoor Track and Field Championships.

International competitions

National competitions

Personal records
Outdoor
Long jump –  (2015)
Triple jump –  (2012)
100-meter dash – 11.81 sec (2009)
400-meter dash – 55.45 sec (2013)
Indoor
Long jump –  (2013)
Triple jump –  (2013)

References

External links

1991 births
Living people
Track and field athletes from Washington (state)
People from University Place, Washington
American female long jumpers
American female triple jumpers
Olympic track and field athletes of the United States
Athletes (track and field) at the 2016 Summer Olympics
USA Outdoor Track and Field Championships winners
Kansas Jayhawks women's track and field athletes
University of Kansas alumni